The Kissing Booth 2 is a 2020 American teen romantic comedy film directed by Vince Marcello and written by Marcello and Jay Arnold. As a direct sequel to the 2018 film The Kissing Booth and the second installment in the Kissing Booth trilogy (itself based on The Kissing Booth books by Beth Reekles), the film stars Joey King, Joel Courtney and Jacob Elordi.

The film was released on July 24, 2020, by Netflix. Like its predecessor, the film received generally negative reviews from critics. A third installment was released on August 11, 2021.

Plot
Elle's senior year begins with classmates gossiping that she and Noah will eventually break up, making her fear elevate as Noah has befriended an attractive British girl named Chloe on Instagram.

Elle and Lee are planning the kissing booth again for the Charity Fair, and he is trying to convince her to ask Marco Peña, the new transfer student known as the new "Noah Flynn," be one of the kissers. Beating Marco on the dancing game, she forces him to participate in the booth. Noah suggests Elle apply to Harvard, which clashes with her plans to study at University of California, Berkeley with Lee (where their moms met and became friends). Elle does it secretly.

Talking with her father about college tuition, Elle learns money is a problem, and decides to participate with Lee in a dance competition with a cash reward for first place. She visits Noah in Boston, meeting his new friends and Chloe, making her more insecure. She finds Chloe's earring under Noah's bed, which causes her to leave Boston. Confronting Noah, he assures her nothing has happened between him and Chloe and he asks her to trust him, though she is still skeptical. Lee has an accident on one of their practice sessions (later revealed to be fake) and proposes that Marco become her dance partner, which she isn't too happy about but eventually does. As Marco and Elle start spending time together, they grow closer, and an attraction starts between them.

Unbeknownst to Elle, Lee's having problems with Rachel, as Elle goes everywhere with them and does not give them alone time. After leaving Rachel waiting at the movies, she asks Lee to talk with Elle, which he promises but never does. The Halloween Dance arrives, and Lee forgets to tell Rachel they changed costumes (Rachel was a marshmallow while Lee and Elle were going to be crackers making a smore), upsetting her even more. Elle shares a dance with Marco, almost kissing him but stops upon hearing people gossiping about her.

Lee finds in his car trunk Elle's applications to Harvard, angering him. Elle and Marco excel at their performance, and she kisses him at the end of their dance, not knowing Noah was in the crowd, causing him to walk away.

Thanksgiving dinner happens at Flynn's, where Noah arrives with Chloe, upsetting Elle, who Lee confronts for not telling him about her application to Harvard and Rachel is upset with her as well. During dinner, Rachel discovers Lee never spoke with Elle and leaves. Catching up with her, Rachel breaks up with him. Elle tries to convince Rachel to reconcile with Lee but is unsuccessful. She also returns the earring to Chloe, who confirms it's hers. She reveals to Noah in a bar that one night she slept in Noah's room when he was out and lost it.

The carnival day arrives, and Lee and Rachel reconcile after being blindfolded and kissing at the kissing booth. Elle is also blindfolded and is approached by Marco, who wants to talk with her about their feelings. She admits there is an attraction between them but tells him she loves Noah and goes looking for him at the airport. Chloe tells her that he went to look for her, and Elle finds him in the park where they first kissed. Noah confesses to being embarrassed he wasn't doing as well at Harvard as he initially thought. He also wants a relationship with Chloe like Elle has with Lee. Elle and Noah reunite.

A few months later, Noah returns, and Elle, Lee, and Rachel graduate. Lee shares with Elle that he was accepted at Berkeley and asked if she received a response. She answers she was waitlisted at both Berkeley and Harvard. When Elle opens both envelopes in her room, it turns out she was accepted to both universities, forcing her to make a decision: go to Harvard with Noah or Berkeley with Lee.

Cast

 Joey King as Elle Evans
 Joel Courtney as Lee Flynn
 Jacob Elordi as Noah Flynn
 Taylor Zakhar Perez as Marco Valentin Peña
 Maisie Richardson-Sellers as Chloe Winthrop
 Molly Ringwald as Mrs. Flynn
 Meganne Young as Rachel
 Stephen Jennings as Mike Evans
 Chloe Williams as Joni Evans
 Morné Visser as Mr. Flynn
 Bianca Bosch as Olivia
 Zandile Madliwa as Gwyneth
 Camilla Wolfson as Mia 
 Carson White as Brad Evans
 Judd Krok as Ollie
 Frances Sholto-Douglas as Vivian
 Evan Hengst as Miles
 Sanda Shandu as Randy
 Hilton Pelser as Barry
 Trent Rowe as Melvin
 Michelle Allen as Heather
 Joshua Eddy as Tuppen
 Nathan Lynn as Cameron
 Byron Langley as Warren
 David Morin as Principal Morin

Production
In February 2019, it was announced Joey King, Joel Courtney and Jacob Elordi would reprise their roles, with Vince Marcello directing from a screenplay he wrote alongside Jay Arnold, with Netflix distributing. In May 2019, Maisie Richardson-Sellers and Taylor Zakhar Perez joined the cast of the film, with Meganne Young, Carson White and Molly Ringwald reprising their roles.

Principal photography concluded in August 2019, taking place in South Africa.

Release
The film was released on July 24, 2020 on Netflix. It was the top-streamed film in its opening weekend, while the first film ranked third. It placed second in its sophomore weekend, with Forbes noting it as "one of the most popular movies ever on the platform." In October 2020, Netflix reported 66 million households watched the film over its first four weeks of release.

Critical response 
The website's critics consensus reads: "Joey King makes The Kissing Booth 2 better than it could have been, but this slapdash sequel will leave viewers puckering up for all the wrong reasons." On Metacritic, the film has a weighted average score of 39 out of 100, based on 12 critics, indicating "generally unfavorable reviews".

IndieWire's Kate Erbland gave it a grade C+, and wrote: "While it offers some necessary growth for all of its characters, The Kissing Booth 2 can never resist looking and acting like dozens of other offerings of its genre ilk, unable to grow beyond basic complications and done-to-death dramas. And yet there are hints that its evolution has a few more tricks left to employ, its winking conclusion only one of them." Clarisse Loughrey of The Independent gave the film a score of 2 out of 5 stars, writing: "To The Kissing Booth 2’s credit, it’s not as aggressively problematic as its predecessor."

Adam Graham of The Detroit News gave the film a grade of B, writing that the film "is a sun-kissed fantasy with an appealing cast and a slick presentation that provides an easy escape, and that's OK, too." Robyn Bahr of The Hollywood Reporter wrote that the film "wades into the quagmire of what happens when the glow fades from a new relationship", and concluded: "As I might have said during my own high school days, The Kissing Booth 2 is “mad stupid,” but it’s still not as overtly slappable as Netflix’s other low-budget teen comedies."

Sequel 

The Kissing Booth 3 was released on Netflix worldwide on Wednesday, August 11 at 12am PT and 3am ET in the US.

References

External links
 
 

2020 films
2020s coming-of-age comedy films
2020 romantic comedy films
2020s teen comedy films
American coming-of-age comedy films
American romantic comedy films
American sequel films
American teen comedy films
2020s English-language films
Films based on British novels
Films based on young adult literature
Films set in Los Angeles
Films shot in Los Angeles
Films shot in South Africa
English-language Netflix original films
Films directed by Vince Marcello
2020s American films